Adler Capelli (born 8 November 1973) is an Italian former track cyclist. He competed at the 1992, 1996 and the 2000 Summer Olympics.

Major results
1996
 1st  Team pursuit, World Track Championships
1997
 1st  Team pursuit, World Track Championships
 World Cup Classics
2nd Team pursuit, Quatro Sant'Elana
1998
 3rd Team pursuit, World Track Championships
 World Cup Classics
1st Team pursuit, Hyères
2000
 World Cup Classics
1st Team pursuit, Turin

References

External links
 

1973 births
Living people
Italian male cyclists
Olympic cyclists of Italy
Cyclists at the 1992 Summer Olympics
Cyclists at the 1996 Summer Olympics
Cyclists at the 2000 Summer Olympics
UCI Track Cycling World Champions (men)
Cyclists from Bologna
Italian track cyclists
20th-century Italian people
21st-century Italian people